

Financial and economic doctrines

Bernanke doctrine named after Ben Bernanke
Friedman doctrine named after Milton Friedman

Legal doctrines

Most legal doctrines are named after the cases. This section only includes doctrines named after the judges who formulated them.

Political and military doctrines

Argentinian doctrines

Calvo Doctrine named after Carlos Calvo (historian)
Drago Doctrine named after Luis María Drago

Belgian doctrines

Harmel Doctrine named after Pierre Harmel
Maddens Doctrine named after Bart Maddens

Chilean doctrines

Schneider Doctrine named after René Schneider

Danish doctrines

Ellemann–Jensen doctrine named after Uffe Ellemann-Jensen

Finnish doctrines

Paasikivi–Kekkonen Line named after Finland's consecutive presidents Juho Kusti Paasikivi and Urho Kekkonen.

French doctrines

Mitterrand doctrine

German doctrines

Hallstein Doctrine also known as Hallstein–Grewe Doctrine, named after Walter Hallstein and Wilhelm Grewe
Ulbricht Doctrine named after Walter Ulbricht

Indian doctrines

Gujral Doctrine named after I. K. Gujral

Iranian doctrines

Favadi Doctrine named after Ali Fadavi

Israeli doctrines

Begin Doctrine named after Menachem Begin

Japanese doctrines

Fukuda Doctrine named after Takeo Fukuda
Taika Reform named after Emperor Kōtoku who took the name "Taika"
Yoshida Doctrine named after Shigeru Yoshida

Korean doctrines

MB Doctrine named after Lee Myung-bak

Mexican doctrines

Castañeda Doctrine named after Jorge G. Castañeda
Estrada Doctrine named after Genaro Estrada

Russian/Soviet doctrines

Brezhnev Doctrine named after Leonid Brezhnev
Sinatra Doctrine named by Gennadi Gerasimov after Frank Sinatra
Zhdanov Doctrine named after Andrei Zhdanov

UK doctrines

Wilson Doctrine named after Harold Wilson

US doctrines

Bush Doctrine named after George W. Bush
Carter Doctrine  
Clark Memorandum named after J. Reuben Clark
Clinton Doctrine 
Eisenhower Doctrine
Hillary Doctrine named after Hillary Clinton   
Johnson Doctrine
Kennedy Doctrine
Kirkpatrick Doctrine
Monroe Doctrine named after James Monroe
Negroponte doctrine named after John Negroponte
Nixon Doctrine
Obama Doctrine named after Barack Obama
Powell Doctrine named after Colin Powell
Reagan Doctrine named after Ronald Reagan
Roosevelt Corollary named after Theodore Roosevelt
Rumsfeld Doctrine named after Donald Rumsfeld
Schlesinger Doctrine named after James Schlesinger
Stimson Doctrine named after Henry L. Stimson
Truman Doctrine   
Weinberger Doctrine named after Caspar Weinberger
Wolfowitz Doctrine named after Paul Wolfowitz

Yugoslav doctrines

Titoism named after Josip Broz Tito

Religious doctrines

Armstrongism named after Herbert W. Armstrong
Doctrine of Addai named after Thaddeus of Edessa known as Saint Addai
Doctrine of Calvin named after John Calvin
Doctrine of Father Divine
Doctrines of Meister Eckhart
Molinism named after Luis de Molina
Nestorian doctrine named after Nestorius
Priscillianism named after Priscillian
Socinianism named after Fausto Sozzini
Wahhabism named after Muhammad ibn Abd al-Wahhab

Fictional doctrines

Dulles Doctrine attributed to Allen Dulles

Lists of eponyms